Elias Gottlob Haussmann (also Haußmann or Hausmann) (1695 – 11 April 1774) was a German painter in the late Baroque era. Haussmann served as court painter at Dresden, and from 1720 as the official portraitist at Leipzig. He is mostly known for his portrait of Johann Sebastian Bach which was painted in 1746.

Life
Haussmann was born in Gera. He was at first a pupil of his father, Elias Haußmann (1663–1733), who was the Landgrave of Hesse's court painter. Haussmann was in the royal Hessian service, as he was mentioned in a September 1717 letter of recommendation from Landgrave Ernst Ludwig of Hesse-Darmstadt as "Our court painter's son".

The Landgrave allowed him a study trip through Germany, where he met portraitist Francesco Carlo Rusca at Lugano. Haussmann also met the Dresden court painter Ádám Mányoki, who wrote favorably of him.

Haussman and the guild quarrelled in 1729 and 1742 because he refused to become a burgher or to come to agreements with the guild. These disputes are also accepted as a reason that Mányoki revoked his recommendation.

In 1723 Haussmann was appointed court painter to Augustus II the Strong, King of Poland and Elector of Saxony. In 1725 he returned to Leipzig. In 1726 he took over the clientele of his predecessor, beginning with a portrait of the merchant Johann Heinrich Linke. In the 1760s, he and his school were replaced by Ernst Gottlob and Anton Graff. Haussmann was also a long-time painter of the Protestant clergy.

Works
The City Historical Museum of Leipzig in the Old Town Hall, where the Bach portrait hangs, also has several other oil paintings by Haussmann and a variety of his copperplate engravings. Most Haussmann paintings can easily be attributed – he regularly signed his works on the back with his name and the date.

Haussmann's early portraits, like that of Gottfried Reiches, display individual composition, technical careful execution, a high level of detail, and realistic emotional expressions. Many later portraits on the other hand, possess typical characteristics of serial images. Especially in the years after 1760, they use the same measurements and often show the subjects in the same attitude. Often there are identical clothes in the same colors within a series of portraits of rather insignificant officials. Georg Müller writes of an "image factory".

Engravings made by others were enhanced with titles, career and personal data.

Haussmann's oil paintings and the larger number of etchings  show a cross section of the leading layer of the bourgeoisie of Leipzig from the fields of politics, administration, judiciary, the church, business (especially trade and crafts), science and art. Examples include:

Mayor Gottfried Wilhelm Küster
Councillor and builder Kaspar Richter
Councillor and city judge 
Pastor Gottlieb Gauditz
Archdeacon Christian Weiß
Councillor and merchant 
Merchant Johann Heinrich Linke
Jurist Christian Gottfried Moerlin
University professor August Friedrich Müller
Kapellmeister and Thomaskantor Johann Sebastian Bach
Senior municipal musician Gottfried Reiche
Writer Luise Gottsched

References

Further reading

External links

1695 births
1774 deaths
People from Gera
18th-century German painters
18th-century German male artists
German male painters
German portrait painters
Court painters